The Men's points race at the 2014 Commonwealth Games, as part of the cycling programme, took place on 26 July 2014.

Results

Qualifying
Heat 1

Heat 2

Finals

References

Men's points race
Cycling at the Commonwealth Games – Men's points race